Psychroflexus tropicus is an obligately halophilic Cytophaga–Flavobacterium–Bacteroides group bacterium. It is Gram-negative, fine rod- to short filament-shaped, with type strain  LA1T (=ATCC BAA-734T =DSM 15496T).

References

Further reading
Schinner, Franz, Jean-Claude Marx, and Charles Gerday, eds. Psychrophiles: from biodiversity to biotechnology. Berlin, Heidelberg: Springer, 2008.

Villanueva, Laura, et al. "Combined phospholipid biomarker-16S rRNA gene denaturing gradient gel electrophoresis analysis of bacterial diversity and physiological status in an intertidal microbial mat." Applied and Environmental Microbiology 70.11 (2004): 6920–6926.

External links 
LPSN

Type strain of Psychroflexus tropicus at BacDive -  the Bacterial Diversity Metadatabase

Flavobacteria
Bacteria described in 2004